William Jones (25 February 1883 – 18 June 1942) was a British wrestler. He competed in the men's freestyle featherweight at the 1908 Summer Olympics.

References

External links
 

1883 births
1942 deaths
British male sport wrestlers
Olympic wrestlers of Great Britain
Wrestlers at the 1908 Summer Olympics
Place of birth missing